Henry Charles McWeeney (1867–1935) was an Irish mathematician, who was Professor of Mathematics at University College Dublin (UCD) from 1891 until his death in 1935.  From 1909 on he served as vice president of UCD.

Education and career
McWeeney was born in Dublin and was educated at University College Dublin (BSc 1887, MSc 1890) and Trinity College Dublin (BA 1889). He won a Royal University of Ireland Travelling Studentship award in 1891, and spent his entire career at UCD.  He also taught at St Patrick's College, Drumcondra, from 1892 to 1910.

Speaking of his days as a student at UCD in the mid 1880s, McWeeney remembers listening to the Professor of Mathematics there, John Casey, who had a mixed class of students.
"Although the book-work which he communicated would not have been adequate for the training of a higher mathematician, yet his explanations, so far as they went, were marked by extreme lucidity." 

In the article Mathematics in U.C.D. 1854 to 1974 by J. R. Timoney recalls McWeeney and Egan giving the traditional rite of passage lectures to brand new first year students in the autumn of 1927:

Timoney went on to say, "He was a magnificent teacher and a geometer of great elegance.  A favourite expression of he was 'if you attack it judiciously it will come out in a line'."

References

External links
 

19th-century Irish mathematicians
20th-century Irish mathematicians
Academics of University College Dublin
Academics of St Patrick's College, Maynooth
Alumni of University College Dublin
Alumni of Trinity College Dublin
Scientists from Dublin (city)
1867 births
1935 deaths